Sodus Township is a civil township of Berrien County in the U.S. state of Michigan.  The population was 1,932 at the 2010 census. There are no incorporated municipalities in the township. The unincorporated community of Sodus in the northwest of the township is its main settlement; the portion of the township just to the west is part of the Benton Harbor/St. Joseph urban area.

History
Probably the first entrepreneur in Sodus Township was James LaRue, a New Jersey native, who purchased riverfront land for the construction of a sawmill in 1835. The first permanent settler, however, was David S. Rector who, in 1837, took possession of 40 acres of land. 
 The name of the township came from Rector. He and his brother, William H., came to the area by way of keel boat from Sodus, New York, so the township was named such in 1859 after the town from which they departed.

In 1853, Joab Enos built a flour mill, also on Pipestone Creek. The township was organized on October 11, 1859. In 1891, Ernest Tabor established Tabor Farm Summer Resort on the banks of the St. Joseph River. The resort was open during summers and hosted reunions, conventions and banquets. From 1961 to 1983, it was owned and managed by Alma and Valdas Adamkus, future President of Lithuania. The resort was closed in 1990.

Sodus has had retail establishments in the past, though it has none now.

Geography
The St. Joseph River forms most of the western boundary of the township, with Royalton Township on the other side of the river. The township shares a short western border with the community of Fair Plain in Benton Charter Township north of the St. Joseph River. Benton Charter Township continues as the township to the north, Bainbridge Township is to the northeast, Pipestone Township to the east, Berrien Township to the southeast, and Oronoko Charter Township to the south. A new segment of US 31 was completed in August 2003 that re-routed the highway through the township. Interstate 94 crosses the northwest corner of the township with two interchanges located nearby.

Demographics
As of the census of 2000, there were 2,139 people, 884 households, and 570 families residing in the township. The racial makeup of the township was 87.19% White, 8.37% African American, 0.28% Native American, 0.05% Asian, 0.23% Pacific Islander, 1.26% from other races, and 2.62% from two or more races. Hispanic or Latino of any race were 8.74% of the population.

There were 884 households, out of which 24.5% had children under the age of 18 living with them, 52.0% were married couples living together, 8.7% had a female householder with no husband present, and 35.5% were non-families. 31.7% of all households were made up of individuals, and 14.3% had someone living alone who was 65 years of age or older.  The average household size was 2.29 and the average family size was 2.86.

In the township the population was spread out, with 22.5% under the age of 18, 7.6% from 18 to 24, 27.2% from 25 to 44, 25.2% from 45 to 64, and 17.5% who were 65 years of age or older.  The median age was 41 years. For every 100 females, there were 102.0 males.  For every 100 females age 18 and over, there were 101.3 males.

The median income for a household in the township was $33,804, and the median income for a family was $42,250. Males had a median income of $34,018 versus $22,824 for females. The per capita income for the township was $17,646.  About 6.6% of families and 13.6% of the population were below the poverty line, including 12.6% of those under age 18 and 12.3% of those age 65 or over.

Culture
Sodus is the birthplace of Basketball Hall of Fame referee and former Chicago sportswriter James Enright.

The novel At Home in Old Sodus by Michael Jewell is set in Sodus Township.

References

External links
 Sodus Township official website
 Sodus Township Library

Townships in Berrien County, Michigan
Townships in Michigan